Khabib Mevlidinovich Allakhverdiev (born 8 December 1982) is a Russian former professional boxer of Lezgin descent who competed from 2007 to 2015. He held the WBA (Regular) and IBO super-lightweight titles from 2012 to 2014, and as an amateur won a bronze medal in the lightweight division at the 2005 World Championships.

Amateur career
Allakhverdiev won bronze at the 2005 World Amateur Boxing Championships in the lightweight division, losing to eventual winner Yordenis Ugás.

Allakhverdiev had an amateur record of around 220 fights.

Professional career
He turned professional in 2007 and was promoted by Warriors Boxing and Top Rank. His biggest accomplishments came in 2012, when he first won the IBO junior welterweight title against Kaizer Mabuza, knocking him out in four rounds. The following year he defeated then-unbeaten Joan Guzmán to win the WBA super lightweight title. Allakhverdiev was supposed to make a defense with Breidis Prescott but he got injured and pulled out so Terence Crawford replaced him. One defense was made of both titles in 2013, when Allakhverdiev defeated Souleymane M'baye via late-rounds stoppage. In 2014, Allakhverdiev suffered his first professional loss in a closely contested bout against Jessie Vargas, which went the full twelve-round distance. In 2015, he lost by TKO to Adrien Broner, and has not fought since.

Professional boxing record

References

External links

1982 births
Living people
Russian people of Lezgian descent
Russian people of Dagestani descent
Lightweight boxers
People from Kaspiysk
Russian male boxers
AIBA World Boxing Championships medalists
World Boxing Association champions
International Boxing Organization champions
Light-welterweight boxers
World light-welterweight boxing champions
Sportspeople from Dagestan